Heterixalus carbonei is a species of frogs in the family Hyperoliidae endemic to Madagascar. Its natural habitats are subtropical or tropical dry forests, subtropical or tropical moist lowland forests, freshwater marshes, and intermittent freshwater marshes.
It is threatened by habitat loss.

References

Heterixalus
Endemic frogs of Madagascar
Taxonomy articles created by Polbot
Amphibians described in 2000